LTL may refer to:
 Learning through Landscapes, a United Kingdom school grounds charity supporting outdoor spaces for play and learning
 Less than truckload, a freight industry term describing quantity
 Less than lethal, weapons intended to cause bodily injury instead of death
 Linear temporal logic, a field of mathematical logic
 Littleborough railway station, with National Rail station code "LTL"
 The ISO 4217 currency code for the Lithuanian litas, former currency of Lithuania
 Loyal Temperance Legion, Woman's Christian Temperance Union branch encouraging substance abuse avoidance